Guinevere is a 1994 Lifetime Television television film based on the Arthurian legend. The story is told from Queen Guinevere's point of view, presenting her as the driving force behind the success of Camelot. It was adapted from author Persia Woolley's Guinevere trilogy of novels: Child of the Northern Spring, Queen of the Summer Stars, and Guinevere: The Legend in Autumn.

See also
List of films based on Arthurian legend

External links

1994 television films
1994 films
1994 fantasy films
Arthurian films
1990s feminist films
American sword and sorcery films
Films directed by Jud Taylor
Films based on American novels
Lifetime (TV network) films
American feminist films
1990s American films